An annular solar eclipse occurred on Sunday, June 21, 2020. An annular solar eclipse is a solar eclipse whose presentation looks like a ring, or annulus; it occurs when the Moon's apparent diameter is smaller than the sun's, blocking most, but not all, of the sun's light. In this instance, the moon's apparent diameter was 0.6% smaller than the sun's.

An annular solar eclipse that occurred prior was on December 26, 2019.

Path
The path of this annular eclipse passed through parts of Central and Eastern Africa; southern Arabian Peninsula, including Yemen, Oman, and southern Saudi Arabia; parts of South Asia and the Himalayas, including southern Pakistan, northern India, and Nepal; parts of East Asia, including South China and Taiwan, and part of Micronesia, including Guam. A partial eclipse was visible throughout much of the rest of Africa, southeastern Europe, most of Asia, and in New Guinea and northern Australia just before sunset. In Europe, the partial eclipse was visible to places southeast of the line passing through parts of Italy, Hungary, Ukraine, and southwestern Russia.

Gallery

Related eclipses

Eclipses of 2020 
 A penumbral lunar eclipse on January 10.
 A penumbral lunar eclipse on June 5.
 An annular solar eclipse on June 21.
 A penumbral lunar eclipse on July 5.
 A penumbral lunar eclipse on November 30.
 A total solar eclipse on December 14.

Tzolkinex 
 Preceded: Solar eclipse of May 10, 2013
 Followed: Solar eclipse of August 2, 2027

Half-Saros cycle 
 Preceded: Lunar eclipse of June 15, 2011
 Followed: Lunar eclipse of June 26, 2029

Tritos 
 Preceded: Solar eclipse of July 22, 2009
 Followed: Solar eclipse of May 21, 2031

Solar Saros 137 
 Preceded: Solar eclipse of June 10, 2002
 Followed: Solar eclipse of July 2, 2038

Inex 
 Preceded: Solar eclipse of July 11, 1991
 Followed: Solar eclipse of May 31, 2049

Triad 
 Preceded: Solar eclipse of August 21, 1933
 Followed: Solar eclipse of April 23, 2107

Solar eclipses of 2018–2021

Saros 137 

It is a part of Saros cycle 137, an eclipse series repeating every 18 years and 11 days, containing 70 events. The series started with the partial solar eclipse on May 25, 1389. It contains total eclipses from August 20, 1533, through December 6, 1695, the first set of hybrid eclipses from December 17, 1713, through February 11, 1804, the first set of annular eclipses from February 21, 1822, through March 25, 1876, a second set of hybrid eclipses from April 6, 1894, through April 28, 1930, and the second set of annular eclipses from May 9, 1948, through April 13, 2507. The series ends at member 70 as a partial eclipse on June 28, 2633. All eclipses in this series occurs at the Moon’s ascending node.

Inex series

Metonic series

References

External links 

solar-eclipse.de: The annular solar eclipse of 06/21/2020
Annular Solar Eclipse 2020
 Chinese satellite images (via twitter)

2020 6 21
2020 in science
2020 06 21
June 2020 events